"Break the Chain" is a song by Japanese rock band Tourbillon, and was the band's fifth and final single. It was released a year-and-a-half following the release of their second album A Tide of New Era, and was used as the opening theme for the 2008 television series Kamen Rider Kiva. Ryuichi Kawamura stated that the song was not just the "let's beat up the bad guys!" kind of Kamen Rider Series opening theme, but a song that both children and adults can enjoy.

"Break the Chain" reached the number 3 position of the Oricon Weekly Charts on the week of its release, the highest ranked single the band ever released. As Tourbillion ceased activities following the release of "Break the Chain", the song was not included on any of their albums. It would later be included in the Kamen Rider Kiva soundtracks and it was also featured on the "Song Attack Ride" album series during the broadcast of the successor to Kiva, Kamen Rider Decade, where it was remixed by Rider Chips and Shuhei Naruse.

Track listing

References

2008 singles
Japanese television drama theme songs
Songs with lyrics by Shoko Fujibayashi
Kamen Rider
Songs with music by Shuhei Naruse
2008 songs
Avex Trax singles